Lipovšek is a Slovenian surname that may refer to:

Boštjan Lipovšek (born 1974), Slovenian horn player
Marijan Lipovšek (1910–1995), Slovenian composer, pianist, and teacher
Marjana Lipovšek (born 1946), Slovenian opera and concert singer
Stanislav Lipovšek (born 1943), Slovenian Roman Catholic prelate
Tomás Lipovšek Puches (born 1993), Slovenian-Argentine tennis player

Slovene-language surnames